Giannino Ferrari Dalle Spade (9 November 1885 – 8 November 1943) was an Italian jurist.

Life 

Ferrari Dalle Spade was born in Tregnago, province of Verona. He graduated at the University of Padua, where he was a student of Nino Tamassia. He worked at the University of Ferrara as a scholar from 1908 working on the legislation of the Republic of Venice, Early Middle Ages, and Byzantine Empire. His theories opposed Francesco Schupfer findings. He died in his hometown in 1943.

Works

References 

P. S. Leicht, in Rivista italiana per le scienze giuridiche, LIV (1947), pp. 276-.
A. Checchini, in Annuario 1946-1947, Università degli studi di Padova, Padova 1947, pp. 159–175
M. A. De Dominicis, Il metodo e l'indirizzo storico-romanistico nell'opera di Giannino Ferrari, in Rivista di storia del diritto italiano, XXIII (1950), pp. 97–171.

1885 births
1943 deaths
20th-century Italian jurists